The Green Confederation (sometimes seen as the Greens Confederation or Vanuatu Green Confederation) is a green political party in Vanuatu.
At the legislative election of 2008 the party won 2 out of 52 seats, increasing to 3 seats at the election of 2012 with 3.5% of the votes. Its most prominent member is Moana Carcasses Kalosil, former deputy leader of the opposition, former cabinet minister and former Prime Minister of Vanuatu. It was soon joined by two other MPs, increasing its numbers to five.

Election results

See also
Green party
List of environmental organizations

Political parties in Vanuatu
Green political parties
Main